The Didam Open was a darts tournament in Didam which was held for one year in 2009 before its cancellation in 2010.

List of winners

2009 establishments in the Netherlands
2010 disestablishments in the Netherlands
Darts tournaments